The Araparera River is a small river in the Auckland Region, New Zealand. It flows west into a southeastern arm of Kaipara Harbour.

See also
List of rivers of New Zealand

References
Land Information New Zealand - Search for Place Names

External links
Photographs of Araparera River held in Auckland Libraries' heritage collections.

Rodney Local Board Area
Rivers of the Auckland Region
Kaipara Harbour catchment